Lost Boyz Forever is a compilation album from hip hop group the Lost Boyz. Group member Freaky Tah was murdered in 1999, and the three remaining members split after their album LB IV Life. DJ Spigg Nice was sentenced to prison after a string of bank robberies, leaving only Mr. Cheeks and Pretty Lou remaining.

The album is composed of previously unreleased tracks, as well as past hits "Jeeps, Lex Coups, Bimaz & Benz" and "Renee".

Track listing

Lost Boyz albums
Albums produced by Erick Sermon
Albums produced by Easy Mo Bee
2005 compilation albums